William Paul Yarbrough Story (born March 20, 1989) is a professional soccer player who plays as a goalkeeper for Major League Soccer club Colorado Rapids. Born in Mexico, he represented the United States national team.

Personal life
Yarbrough was born and raised in Aguascalientes, Mexico, to American parents who emigrated from Texas in the 1980s. His parents are missionaries Lee Yarbrough and Stacey Story, who decided to live in Mexico, after having their honeymoon there. 
He is a devout Christian.

Club career

Pachuca
Yarbrough started his career at six years old with Gallos de Aguascalientes. In 2005, he was invited for a trial with the U17 team of C.F. Pachuca and later signed with them at the age of sixteen. He played until April 2010 for the youth squad of Pachuca and was loaned out to his first senior team, Jaibos Tampico Madero. He was on loan until July 2011, participating in 38 matches during the Liga Premier de México 2010–2011 season. In summer 2011, he joined Titanes Tulancingo on another loan.

León
During the 2012–2013 season, he was loaned out to Club León  from Pachuca, and did not play a league match during the 2012 Apertura tournament. Yarbrough played his only match in the first round of the Copa MX Apertura against Dorados de Sinaloa. Yarbrough was the starting goalkeeper for León until the end of the 2013 Clausura tournament, playing 8 matches.

Yarbrough eventually joined León on a permanent basis, becoming their starting goalkeeper for most matches of both the Apertura and Clausura over the following seasons, and helped León to two Liga MX titles. In the 2015 Apertura and 2016 Clausura, Yarbrough led León to a third-place finish, while leading all Liga MX goalkeepers in both saves and clean sheets.

In May 2018, León acquired Rodolfo Cota. Cota took over as the starting goalkeeper. Yarbrough started four matches late in 2018, and started two matches in September 2019.

On March 6, 2020, Yarbrough was loaned to MLS side Colorado Rapids for one year.

Colorado Rapids
Yarbrough made his Rapids debut against Sporting Kansas City at the MLS is Back Tournament on July 17, 2020. Yarbrough earned his first Rapids victory and clean sheet in a 5–0 win over Real Salt Lake to reclaim the Rocky Mountain Cup. Yarbrough ended the season with a 6-4-4 (W-L-D) record and four clean sheets. Yarbrough also started Colorado's first-round playoff loss at Minnesota United FC. 

On February 2, 2021, Yarbrough moved permanently to Colorado Rapids on a 3-year deal. In week two of the 2023, Ferreira was named to the league's Team of the Matchday after registering 11 saves in a scoreless draw against Sporting Kansas City, becoming the first player in club history to do so.

International career
In 2007, Yarbrough received a call up to the Mexico national under-20 team. In an interview, Yarbrough said though he had been called up for the Mexico under-20s, he had no preference between the two national teams as he is eligible to represent both. Despite accepting a call-up from the Mexican Federation in 2007, he ended up accepting an offer to the U.S. national team.

Yarbrough earned his first call-up to the United States national team in March 2015. He appeared in the bench when the United States played against Denmark on March 25, 2015. Yarbrough substituted Nick Rimando in the beginning of the second half against Switzerland on March 31 to earn his first cap. Yarbrough conceded one goal against Switzerland; the game ended in a 1–1 draw. In his second appearance for the United States, Yarbrough was subbed in for Rimando at halftime during a friendly against Mexico on April 15, 2015.  He had two saves in the 2–0 victory for the U.S.

Yarbrough made his 3rd appearance for the United States team in a friendly match against New Zealand which ended in a 1–1 draw.

Honors
León
Liga MX: Apertura 2013, Clausura 2014

References

External links

 
 
 
 

1989 births
Living people
Footballers from Aguascalientes
Mexican Christians
Citizens of the United States through descent
American soccer players
C.F. Pachuca players
Association football goalkeepers
Club León footballers
Tampico Madero F.C. footballers
Colorado Rapids players
Colorado Rapids 2 players
People from Aguascalientes City
Mexican expatriate footballers
Mexican footballers
Mexican people of American descent
Sportspeople of American descent
Mexico youth international footballers
Liga MX players
Expatriate footballers in Mexico
United States men's international soccer players
2015 CONCACAF Gold Cup players
Major League Soccer players
MLS Next Pro players